The Rugby Union of Slovenia is the governing body for rugby in Slovenia. It oversees the various national teams and the development of the sport.

Leadership

See also
 Rugby union in Slovenia
 Slovenia national rugby union team

External links
Rugby Union of Slovenia
Slovenia at World Rugby

Rugby union in Slovenia
Sports governing bodies in Slovenia
Slovenia
Sports organizations established in 1988
1988 establishments in Slovenia